Ye Stupid Pyar is a 2011 Bollywood romantic film directed by Rakesh Jain, starring debutants Jatin Khurana in lead role. It was produced by M.L. Khurana and Rakesh Jain under the banner of JRD Films.

Synopsis 

Abhishek Khurana (Jatin Khurana) is an NRI based in the US with a high-profile MNC job. He comes to India for a short trip of two weeks and meets a salsa instructor cum gym trainer at a gym. He falls in love with her and joins salsa classes to get closer to her. Soon the two get married. On the wedding night itself, Neha emotionally blackmails him into moving to Bangkok instead of the US. She tells that she doesn't want to go far off from her parents and Abhishek transfers his job from the US office to Bangkok. The newlywed couple then flew to Bangkok.

In Bangkok, when Abhishek returns from his office the very first day, he finds Neha missing. He starts searching for her with the help of his college best friend Simran (Akansha Shivhare). Simran had feelings for Abhishek right from the college days, but he is unaware of it. Simran seeks help from her friend Multiplex (Sahil Vaid) to locate Neha. It turns out that Neha left Abhishek because she loves another guy Rajveer who lives in Bangkok.

Cast 
 Jatin Khurana as Abhishek Khurana
 Akansha Shivhare as Rajveer
 Sahil Vaid as Simran
 Pummy as Abhishek's mother
 Stephanie MacDonald as the Item girl

Soundtrack 
The music for Ye Stupid Pyar is composed by Vipin Patwa and Reeky Dev.

Critical reception

Komal Nahta from Koimoi gave the film only 0.5 stars out of 5. He mentioned the story as childish, screenplay immature and dialogues commonplace. According to him, the histrionics of the lead pair was dull and ordinary. He only applauded Akansha Shivhare's performance. He wrote that it was a poor film and lacked entertainment.

Zinnia Ray Chaudhuri from Daily News and Analysis also gave only 0.5/5 stars. She wrote that the movie is bad throughout and leaves the audience emotionally scarred. According to her, Jatin has no acting skills. Only Akansha was able to leave an impact. She wrote,"The dialogues and the dialogue delivery, both, are laughable and can be best described as cheesy". She also criticized cinematography and dubbing.

Prateeksha Khot from BOLLYSPICE gave only 0.5/5 stars. She wrote,"The acting is amateurish, cinematography by M.A. Shaikh is grainy and sloppy, Rajesh Kanchi’s editing is so-so and choreography by Tejas Dattani, Reshma Khan, Sagar-Bape and Rajiv are strictly average." According to her, the script is silly, music decent and dialogues are just ordinary. She praised Akansha in her minuscule role and mentioned Pummy's portrayal of a loving mother outstanding.

Mansha Rastogi from Nowrunning.com gave only 0.5/5 stars. She wrote,"Having a half-cooked plot replete with non-actors and no graph whatsoever, Rakesh turns YSP from a bad to a worse and intolerable product." She heavily criticized the performance of the lead actor and other side actors. According to her, even in the shooting style and the narrative, there appears no aesthetics. She also condemned the music and background score.

Rohit Vats from ibnlive also had apprehensions and he was not impressed with the basic plot line and acting performances. Even the album seemed to be a half-hearted effort.

References

External links
 
 Ye Stupid Pyar at Bollywood Hungama

2011 films
2010s Hindi-language films